Crataegus pontica is a species of hawthorn found in Turkey (including East Thrace), the South Caucasus, possibly Palestine and Jordan, Iraq, Iran and Central Asia. It is planted as a windbreak, and its yellow to orange fruit are made into marmalade, or dried and ground to be added as a flavoring to baking flour.

References

pontica
Plants described in 1853